A hromada ("community") was one of a network of secret societies of Ukrainian intelligentsia that appeared soon after the Crimean War. The societies laid a groundwork for appearance of the Ukrainian political elite and national political movement. The Ukrainian national and anti-oppressive movement intensified with the January Uprising and issuing of the Valuev Circular. Many were former members of the disbanded Brotherhood of Saints Cyril and Methodius.

In parallel to the development of hromoda networks in the Russian Empire, Prosvita (Enlightenment) societies sprang forth in the Austro-Hungarian Empire.

Important hromadas existed in Saint Petersburg, Kyiv, Poltava, Chernihiv, Odessa, Ternopil, Lviv, Chernivtsi and Stryi.

The first hromada was established in Saint Petersburg when the first members of the Brotherhood of Saints Cyril and Methodius returned from their exile. An important publication of the Petersburg hromada was the magazine Osnova (Basis) that was published for a short time in 1860s. 

Due to student unrest and other revolutionary activity the Russian minister of internal affairs Pyotr Valuev had arrested several hromada leaders (Pavlo Chubynsky, Petro Yefymenko and others) and exiled them to Siberia. After the publication of the Pylyp Morachevsky's New Testament in Ukrainian, Valuev banned most of publications and issued his secret Valuev circular as an instruction to the minister of education. 

The same year most of the western regions of the Russian Empire rebelled in the January Uprising.

The most important hromada was created in Kyiv and became better known as the Old Hromada. It was created sometimes in 1870s based on a secret club of chlopomans (commoners).

As reaction to the hromada movement, the Russian government issued the well known Ems Ukaz in 1876 prohibiting the use of Ukrainian language.

In 1897 on initiative of Volodymyr Antonovych and Oleksandr Konysky in Kyiv took place a congress of Hromada members where was established the General Ukrainian Non-partisan Democratic Organization. To the new organization entered all members of Hromada that existed in 20 cities of the Russian Ukraine. Hromada however continued to exist until the February Revolution in 1917.

See also
 Hromada (disambiguation)
 Bratstvo: Brotherhood of Saints Cyril and Methodius, political and cultural organizations
 Mykhailo Drahomanov

References

External links
 Hromadas at the Encyclopedia of Ukraine
 Hamm, M.F. Kiev: A Portrait, 1800-1917. Princeton University Press. 1993. 

Organizations established in 1858
Ukrainian independence movement
Political organizations based in the Russian Empire
Populism
Secret societies